The Xenomorph is the main fictional antagonist in the Alien franchise.

Xenomorph may also refer to:

 Xenomorph (geology), a mineral that did not develop its external crystal form
 Xenomorph (video game), a 1990 science-fiction role-playing video game
 Xenomorph (band), a Dutch death metal band formed in 1994
 Xenomorph, a fictional creature on the 1988 television series Something Is Out There